The Dream of a Ridiculous Man ( Son smeshnovo cheloveka) is a 1992 Russian animated short film directed by Aleksandr Petrov. It tells the story of a misanthropic man who begins to regain his will to live after a chance encounter with a young girl. The film was made using paint-on-glass animation. It is based on the 1877 short story with the same title by Fyodor Dostoyevsky.

The film won several festival awards including the prize for best film in its length category at the 1992 Ottawa International Animation Festival. It was nominated for the Nika Award for Best Animated Film.

References

1990s animated short films
1992 animated films
1992 films
Films based on short fiction
Films based on works by Fyodor Dostoyevsky
Films directed by Aleksandr Petrov
Paint-on-glass animated films
Russian animated short films
Russian drama films
1992 drama films